"Best of Me" is the first single from RATT's seventh studio album Infestation. It was officially released on February 2, 2010. It reached thirty-six on the Mainstream Rock Tracks in 2010.

Overview
"Best of Me" was written by Stephen Pearcy, Carlos Cavazo, and Michael "Elvis" Baskette. When asked the meaning behind the lyrics in a December 30, 2009 interview, lead singer Stephen Pearcy said of 'Best Of Me': "This song was written for my wife (Melissa Pearcy). It's one of those where you always think the grass is greener on the other side, but in fact it isn't. I'm letting her know 'you're the best thing I got, but I had to go f--- around to figure it out.' It's one of those you don't know what you got till it's gone kind of things. With me, I go through this s--- every day. I'm married one day, then I'm not, but I am."

Music video
RATT's video for “Best Of Me” was premiered worldwide March 22, 2010, on AOL. The video is a visual ode about today's 21st century mass media and information age overload mixed with unabridged live performance. The video also points to a bigger issue here: younger kids on the outside looking in, trying to be a part of the Ratt pack, and the overarching idea that infectious hooks can permeate all aspects of daily life. There's also family cameos, proving that not all relationships suffer because of rock 'n' roll. The video was released on March 29, 2010, on Metal Mania on VH1 Classic. The video directed by Andrew Bennett.

Track listing

Radio promo
 "Best of Me"

CD single
 "Best of Me" - 4:19
 "Eat Me Up Alive" - 4:13
 RATT Return to the Sunset Strip 1-5 - webisode
 "Best of Me" - video
 Making of "Best of Me" - video

References

External links

 Best Of Me Lyrics

2010 singles
Ratt songs
Songs written by Stephen Pearcy
Songs written by Carlos Cavazo
2010 songs
Roadrunner Records singles
Songs written by Michael Baskette
Song recordings produced by Michael Baskette